Golakganj Assembly constituency is one of the 126 constituencies of the Assam Legislative Assembly in India. Golakganj forms a part of the Dhubri Lok Sabha constituency.

Members of Legislative Assembly 
 1951: Santosh Barua, Indian National Congress
 1957: Bhuban Chandra Prodhani, Indian National Congress
 1962: Sarat Chandra Sinha, Indian National Congress
 1967: K. C. Roy Pradhani, Independent
 1972: K. C. Roy Pradhani, Independent
 1978: Alauddin Sarkar, Communist Party of India
 1983: K. C. Roy Pradhani, Indian National Congress
 1985: Dalim Ray, Independent
 1991: Alauddin Sarkar, Communist Party of India
 1996: Alauddin Sarkar, Communist Party of India
 2001: Dinesh Chandra Sarkar, Bharatiya Janata Party
 2006: Abu Taher Bepari, Indian National Congress
 2011: Abu Taher Bepari, Indian National Congress
 2016: Ashwini Roy Sarkar, Bharatiya Janata Party
2021:Abdus Sobahan Ali Sarkar, Indian National Congress

Election results

2016 result

2011 result

External links 
 

Assembly constituencies of Assam